Lamberto Andreotti (born 6 July 1950) is an Italian businessman. He is currently executive chairman of the board of Bristol Myers Squibb.

Biography

Early life
Andreotti was born in Rome, Italy, in 1950, the son of Italian Senator and President of the Council of Ministers Giulio Andreotti. He graduated from Sapienza University of Rome with a degree in engineering; he then achieved a Master of Science degree from Massachusetts Institute of Technology.

Professional roles

He worked for many pharmaceutical companies, including Farmitalia-Carlo Erba then with Pharmacia after Pharmacia acquired Farmitalia.

In 1998, he joined Bristol-Myers Squibb as vice president and general manager of European Oncology and Italy. He was elected to the Board of Directors in March 2009 and became CEO on 4 May 2010.  Prior to taking the role of CEO, he held the role of president and COO.  He retired from Bristol-Myers Squibb in 2015 and took on the role of executive chairman of the company's board, succeeding James M. Cornelius who was retiring from this role.

He was elected to the board of DuPont in 2012.

He was elected to the Board of Directors of UniCredit S.p.A. Bank on 12 May 2018.

References

Italian chief executives
Bristol Myers Squibb people
Directors of DuPont
Living people
1950 births
Businesspeople from Rome
Sapienza University of Rome alumni
Massachusetts Institute of Technology alumni
Chief operating officers
Chief executives in the pharmaceutical industry